Varvara Lepchenko was the defending champion, having won the previous event in 2008, but decided not to participate this year.

Gail Brodsky won the title, defeating fellow qualifier Maegan Manasse in the final, 4–6, 6–1, 6–0.

Seeds

Draw

Finals

Top half

Bottom half

References
Main Draw

Braidy Industries Women's Tennis Classic - Singles